What Hi-Fi? is a magazine published thirteen times a year by Future. It is a buying guide for consumer electronics, featuring news, reviews and features on hi-fi, home cinema, television and home audio. The brand also has a website, whathifi.com.  

These product categories include stereo speakers, TVs, amplifiers, headphones, soundbars, projectors, tablets and turntables. Brands features on the website and magazine cover include Bowers & Wilkins, KEF, Naim, LG and Sony.

Reviews are written in-house at dedicated testing facilities, currently found in London, Reading and Bath.

The magazine has nine international editions, and its publisher claims that its total readership is in excess of one million per issue. The What Hi-Fi? website has a consistently updated library of audio and video hardware reviews, plus news, features, advice and opinion from the editorial team. In the course of 2017, the website reached over 24 million unique users.

What Hi-Fi? was sold to Future Publishing by Haymarket in multi-brand deal for £14m.

History 
The first issue of What Hi-Fi? magazine was published by Haymarket Media Group in the UK in 1976, costing 35p and promising to be “the only magazine to list and price every available hi-fi unit”. 

The magazine was focused on hi-fi equipment for a mainstream audience, recommending turntables and cartridges for people to use at home, but also covered “Sound & Vision” products, including the first Video Recorder machines.

Brand extensions

What Hi-Fi? Awards 
The What Hi-Fi? Awards began in 1983 and have announced the brand's favourite products of the year with a special issue of the magazine, the Awards issue. The What Hi-Fi? Awards are also announced and hosted on the website. In 2022, the What Hi-Fi? Awards featured 109 winners across 26 product categories.

Hall of Fame 
A selection of the brand's favourite products of all time are also presented in the What Hi-Fi? Hall of Fame, which includes products launched in 1976 and right up until the present day. 

Notable products include the Linn LP12 turntable, the Sony Walkman, Acoustic Energy AE1 speakers, Mission Cyrus One amplifier, Sennheiser HD600 headphones, Sky+, Sonos, the Bowers & Wilkins Zeppelin wireless speaker, the Apple iPhone, Pioneer Kuro plasma TVs, the Naim Mu-so, KEF LS50 Wireless speaker system and the Sony WH-1000XM4 wireless headphones.

Australian hi-fi magazines 
In 2020, the website began hosting reviews and features written by Australian Hi-Fi and Sound+Image magazines, following their acquisition by Future.

References

External links

Monthly magazines published in the United Kingdom
Music magazines published in the United Kingdom
Science and technology magazines published in the United Kingdom
Magazines established in 1976
2018 mergers and acquisitions